Haemopis is a genus of leeches belonging to the family Haemopidae. The species of this genus are found in Eurasia and Northern America.

Species
Species include:
Haemopis caballeroi 
Haemopis caeca 
Haemopis elegans 
Haemopis grandis 
Haemopis kingi 
Haemopis lateromaculata 
Haemopis marmorata 
Haemopis ottorum 
Haemopis paludum 
Haemopis plumbea 
Haemopis sanguisuga 
Haemopis septagon 
Haemopis terrestris

References

Leeches
Annelid genera
Taxa named by Marie Jules César Savigny